Charles Duncan McIver (September 27, 1860 – September 17, 1906) was the founder and first president of the institution now known as The University of North Carolina at Greensboro.

He was born 1860 in Lee County, North Carolina and graduated from UNC-Chapel Hill, where he was a member of the Dialectic and Philanthropic Societies, in 1881. McIver became a teacher in Durham and Winston North Carolina until 1889 when he and Edwin A. Alderman were chosen by the Office of the Superintendent of Public Instruction to hold teacher institutes across the state.

As crusaders for women′s education, McIver and Alderman first drew up a plan for a state-supported teachers′ college in 1886. In 1891, they advocated for a new bill focused on a teachers′ college specifically for women (not co–educational). The North Carolina legislature passed this bill, and issued a charter for a ″Normal and Industrial School for White Girls″ on February 18, 1891.

McIver was chosen to be the first president of the State Normal and Industrial School (now UNCG), which opened to students on October 5, 1892. In addition to serving as president, he also taught many of the courses in the pedagogy department. His initial salary was $2250 per year.

McIver was married to Lula V. Martin and they had four children. He died on September 17, 1906 of apoplexy on a train taking William Jennings Bryan from Raleigh to Greensboro. He was buried in Greensboro.

UNCG's McIver Street, two former buildings (The McIver Memorial Building c1908-1956; and its replacement, The McIver Building 1958-2018 [both demolished]), and McIver Parking Deck are named after him, and a statue (dubbed "Charlie" by students) was erected in his honor. It was a campus tradition to paint messages and clothes on the beloved founder until the donation of "The Rawk" in 1973. A duplicate statue is on the grounds of the North Carolina state capitol in Raleigh. He is the only person honored on Capitol Square who was not a political or military leader.

Schools named in his honor include the former Charles D. McIver School at Greensboro, Charles McIver School in Kannapolis (opened in 1908, no longer in use) and the Charles Duncan McIver Special Education Center in Guilford County.

References

External links 
Finding Aid for the Charles Duncan McIver Records, Office of the Chancellor, The University of North Carolina at Greensboro, 1855-1906
Digitized collection of Charles Duncan McIver Records in UNCG Special Collections and University Archives
Images of Textiles and Artifacts from Charles Duncan McIver located in UNCG Special Collections and University Archives

Further reading

External links
 

University of North Carolina at Greensboro faculty
1860 births
1906 deaths
University of North Carolina at Chapel Hill alumni
Presidents of the University of North Carolina System
People from Lee County, North Carolina